AEOI most commonly refers to:
 Atomic Energy Organization of Iran (AEOI)
 Automatic Exchange of Financial Account Information (AEOI), see OECD's Common Reporting Standard.